Lindsay Grant Vallis (born January 12, 1971) is a Canadian former professional ice hockey right winger.  He was drafted in the first round, thirteenth overall, of the 1989 NHL Entry Draft by the Montreal Canadiens.  He played just one game in the National Hockey League, with the Canadiens during the 1993–94 season, going scoreless. He is now a nurse and is married and has two children, Jack & Grace Vallis.

Career statistics

See also
List of players who played only one game in the NHL

External links

1971 births
Living people
Asheville Smoke players
Bakersfield Fog players
Canadian ice hockey right wingers
Fredericton Canadiens players
Hershey Bears players
Ice hockey people from Winnipeg
Montreal Canadiens draft picks
Montreal Canadiens players
National Hockey League first-round draft picks
Seattle Thunderbirds players
Worcester IceCats players